David Pizzoni Elfving (born 26 November 1985) is a Swedish bandy player who plays for Hammarby IF and the Swedish national team as a midfielder.

Career

Club career
Pizzoni Elfving is a youth product of Gustavsbergs IF. He represented Berget BK and Sandvikens AIK, before joining and Hammarby IF in 2007.

He won the Swedish championship with Hammarby IF in 2010 and 2013.

International career
Pizzoni Elfving won the 2017 World Championship with Sweden.

Honours

Club
Hammarby IF
Swedish Championship:  2010, 2013
World Cup: 2009
Svenska Cupen: 2013, 2014

Country
Sweden
 Bandy World Championship: 2017

References

External links
 
 

1985 births
Living people
Swedish people of Italian descent
Swedish bandy players
Gustavsbergs IF players
Sandvikens AIK players
Hammarby IF Bandy players
Sweden international bandy players
Bandy World Championship-winning players